Marked Personal was a British daytime television drama created by Charles Dennis and starring Stephanie Beacham and Heather Chasen. The series was made by Thames Television and consisted of 90  episodes, shown twice weekly on Tuesday and Wednesday afternoons during 1973-74. It is set in the fictional personnel department of a large company called B.Y.A., a large industrial concern. Beacham was replaced by Sheila Scott-Wilkenson playing Lynda Carpenter in later episodes.

The programme's theme tune was composed by Ronald Cass  with actress Stacey Gregg.

Cast

 Stephanie Beacham as Georgina Layton
 Heather Chasen as Isabel Neal 
 Frankie Jordan as Mary Parrish
 Carl Rigg as Gordon Marsh 
 Malcolm Reynolds as Steve Mitchell 
 Sheila Scott-Wilkenson as Lynda Carpenter 
 Maggie Wells as Maggie 
 John Lee as Richard Mason
 Rupert Davies as Dr. Jack Morrison 
 John Paul as Gerald Painter  
 Peter Clay as Phil Davies
 Lloyd Lamble as Geoffrey Bannock
 Glyn Owen as Security Chief Nolan
 Caroline Mortimer as Louise Marsh
 Lewis Collins - Len Thomas
 Trevor T. Smith - Stan Price

References

External links 

1970s British drama television series
ITV television dramas
1973 British television series debuts
1974 British television series endings
Television series by Fremantle (company)
Television shows produced by Thames Television
English-language television shows
Television shows shot at Teddington Studios